
Gmina Jaświły is a rural gmina (administrative district) in Mońki County, Podlaskie Voivodeship, in north-eastern Poland.

Villages
Gmina Jaświły contains the villages and settlements of Bagno, Bobrówka, Brzozowa, Dzięciołowo, Gurbicze, Jadeszki, Jaświłki, Jaświły, Mikicin, Mociesze, Moniuszki, Nowe Dolistowo, Radzie, Romejki, Rutkowskie Duże, Rutkowskie Małe, Stare Dolistowo, Starowola, Stożnowo, Szaciły, Szpakowo and Zabiele.

Neighbouring gminas
Gmina Jaświły is bordered by the gminas of Goniądz, Jasionówka, Korycin, Mońki, Suchowola and Sztabin.

References
Polish official population figures 2006

Jaswily
Mońki County